The 2013–14  Oman Professional League Cup was the third edition of a pre-season football competition held in Oman. It was the first edition since football in Oman entered the professional era.

The competition featured four groups of 3-4 teams(Group A and B featured 3 teams and Group C and D featured 4 teams), with the group stage winners entering the semi final stage. Groups featuring three sides played each other twice so that each team could play 6 matches in the group phase.

The competition featured all the clubs playing in the top flight in the 2013–14 season.

The competition started on 15 August 2013 and finished on 16 November 2013.

Group stage

Group A

Group B

Group C

Group D

Semi finals

Final

External links
SAHAM LIFT THE FIRST OMAN PROFESSIONAL LEAGUE CUP
Oman Federation Cup 2013 at futbol24.com
Omani Professional Cup 2013 at Goalzz.com

Oman Professional League Cup
2013–14 in Omani football